C. J. Wilson may refer to:
C. J. Wilson (born 1980), American baseball player
C. J. Wilson (safety) (born 1985), American football safety
C. J. Wilson (defensive end) (born 1987), American football defensive tackle
C. J. Wilson (cornerback) (born 1989), American football cornerback
C. J. Wilson (actor), actor

See also
Wilson (surname)